The 8th National Geographic Bee was held in Washington, D.C. on May 29, 1996, sponsored by the National Geographic Society. The final competition was moderated by Jeopardy! host Alex Trebek. The winner was Seyi Fayanju of Henry B. Whitehorne Middle School in Verona, New Jersey, who won a $25,000 college scholarship. The 2nd-place winner,  Ryan Bean of Augusta, Maine, won a $15,000 scholarship. The 3rd-place winner, Matthew Conway of El Reno, Oklahoma, won a $10,000 scholarship.

References

External links
 National Geographic Bee Official Website

National Geographic Bee